The Paper People is a Canadian dramatic television film, directed by David Gardner and released in 1967. The first television film ever produced entirely in-house by CBC Television without an outside coproducer, the film centres on Jamie Taylor (Marc Strange), an artist working on a project in which he builds papier-mâché models of people and then films the models being set on fire, and Janet Webb (Marigold Charlesworth), a journalist profiling Jamie in a documentary. The cast also included Lucy Warner, Kate Reid, Brett Somers and Robin Ward.

The film was shot in the summer of 1967, in Toronto and Oakville, Ontario.

The film aired on December 13, 1967 as an episode of the anthology series Festival. It received mixed reviews, with Sheila Keiran of The Globe and Mail panning it as pretentious, arty and boring, while Lorne Parton of The Province called it one of the better films to be released in any format, television or theatrical, that year. The broadcast sparked some controversy, however, with some commentators stating that the Canadian Broadcasting Corporation should not be investing in films that would clearly only appeal to a limited audience.

References

External links

1967 films
Canadian drama television films
CBC Television original films
Works by Timothy Findley
Films shot in Toronto
Films set in Toronto
English-language Canadian films
1960s English-language films
1960s Canadian films